Michael Emilius Macaluso (July 21, 1951 – November 16, 2022) was an American basketball player.  He played 30 games for the Buffalo Braves of the National Basketball Association (NBA) in the 1973–74 season.

Macaluso played college basketball at Canisius College from 1970 to 1973 where he lead his team in scoring in three consecutive seasons and averaged 8.7 rebounds per game, which ranks in the top-10 all-time in school history.  He was inducted into the Canisius College Hall of Fame in 1989.

He was drafted by Buffalo Braves in the sixth round (88th overall) of the 1973 NBA Draft.  He was also drafted by the ABA's Kentucky Colonels that same year.  Macaluso signed with Buffalo.

After his NBA stint, he played for the Israel Sabras in the European Professional Basketball League in 1974-75 where he helped win a championship.  The league folded up after that one season.

After retiring from basketball, Macaluso had a successful entrepreneurial career across various industries including multiple public life sciences enterprises.  He co-founded both Ampio Pharmaceuticals, Inc. and Aytu BioPharma in 2015.

Macaluso died on November 16, 2022, at the age of 71.

References

1951 births
2022 deaths
American men's basketball players
Basketball players from Buffalo, New York
Buffalo Braves draft picks
Buffalo Braves players
Canisius Golden Griffins men's basketball players
Shooting guards